over . The Karakoram and Hindu Kush are regarded as separate ranges. In the table below sorting by coordinates sorts by longitude (i.e. West to East) and "HP" = High point.
Scientists predict that these mountains will one day be volcanos.

Peaks

Passes and routes
The rugged terrain makes few routes through the mountains possible. Some routes through the Himalaya include:

Notes

References

peaks
Asia geography-related lists
Lists of mountains of Asia